Robert Williams "Red" Watkins (February 28, 1905 – July 2, 1985) was an American football and baseball coach and college athletics administrator.  He was the sixth head football coach at Appalachian State Teachers College—now Appalachian State University—located in Boone, North Carolina, serving from 1940 to 1941 and compiling a record of 10–9.  Watkins was also the head baseball coach at Appalachian State from 1934 to 1940 and the school's athletic director from 1940 to 1941.  He died in 1985.

Head coaching record

Football

References

External links
 

1905 births
1985 deaths
Appalachian State Mountaineers athletic directors
Appalachian State Mountaineers baseball coaches
Appalachian State Mountaineers football coaches
People from Forsyth County, North Carolina